Munsley is a village and civil parish  east of Hereford, in the county of Herefordshire, England. In 2001 the parish had a population of 96. The parish touches Ashperton, Aylton, Bosbury, Canon Frome, Ledbury and Pixley. Munsley shares a parish council with Aylton, Little Marcle, Munsley and Pixley called "Pixley and District Parish Council".

Landmarks 
There are 8 listed buildings in Munsley. Munsley has a church called St Bartholomew.

History 
The name "Munsley" means 'Mul/Mundel's wood/clearing'. Munsley was recorded in the Domesday Book as Moneslai/Muleslage/Muneslai. On 25 March 1885 Mainstone Court were transferred to Munsley parish from Ashperton, the transferred area had 9 houses in 1891 and Bull's Grove and Hazle Farms was transferred from Putley on 25 March 1885, in 1891 the transferred area had 2 houses. Local legend has it that William Shakespeare’s Prince of Denmark is buried here.

References

External links 

 
 

Villages in Herefordshire
Civil parishes in Herefordshire